SLD may refer to:

Computers and technology

 Second-level domain, an Internet domain directly beneath the top-level domain
 Simple learning design 2.0, a specification used to express learning activities
 SLD resolution, the basic inference rule used in logic programming
 Stanford Large Detector (1992–1998), for the Stanford Linear Collider
 Superluminescent diode, a light source
 Soft laser desorption, a laser desorption of large molecules that results in ionization without fragmentation

Graphics

 Single-line diagram, of a 3-phase power system
 Straight-line diagram of a road
 Styled Layer Descriptor of map layers

Politics and law
 Democratic Left Alliance (Sojusz Lewicy Demokratycznej), a political party in Poland
 Statute law database, UK

Transport
 Salford Crescent railway station, Greater Manchester, England, National Rail station code SLD
 Sliač Airport, Slovakia, IATA code
 Sutherland railway station, Sydney Sutherland, Australia, station code SLD

Other uses
 SLD glass, with low dispersion
 Specific learning disability, disorders intrinsic to an individual
 Supercooled Large Droplet, a type of atmospheric icing condition
 Delta8-fatty-acid desaturase, an enzyme